Bout can mean:

People 
Viktor Bout, suspected arms dealer
Jan Everts Bout, early settler to New Netherland
Marcel Bout

Musical instruments 
 The outward-facing round parts of the body shape of violins, guitars, and other stringed instruments

Other 
 "Bout" (song), a single by the British artist Jamelia
 A boxing match
 A roller derby match
 An episode of illness